The 1943 Coppa Italia Final was the final of the 1942–43 Coppa Italia. The match was played on 30 May 1943 between Torino and Venezia. Torino won 4–0.

Match

References 
Coppa Italia 1942-43 statistics at rsssf.com
 https://www.calcio.com/calendario/ita-coppa-italia-1942/43-finale/2/
 https://www.worldfootball.net/schedule/ita-coppa-italia-1942/43-finale/2/

Coppa Italia Finals
Coppa Italia Final 1943
Venezia F.C. matches